Non è la RAI (Italian: It’s Not RAI) is an Italian variety television series that aired from 9 September 1991 to 30 June 1995. Initially broadcast by Canale 5, it was moved to Italia 1 in January 1993. The show was presented by Enrica Bonaccorti in its first season, Paolo Bonolis in the second and Ambra Angiolini in the third and fourth.

Produced by Gianni Boncompagni, the show was broadcast every day in the afternoon, starring 100 girls between 14 and 22 years old who sang, danced and presented some telephone competitions. The show created scandal in Italy due to the girls' age and some political declarations by Angiolini, who was 17 years old in 1994.

From the show came many Italian television, music and theatre stars like Angiolini, Pamela Petrarolo, Claudia Gerini, Romina Mondello, Nicole Grimaudo, Antonella Elia, Yvonne Sciò, Alessia Merz, Alessia Mancini, Antonella Mosetti, Emanuela Panatta, Laura Freddi, Miriana Trevisan, Gloria Scotti, Cristina Quaranta, Sabrina Impacciatore, Barbara Lelli and Letizia Catinari.

The program was rebroadcast on the Happy Channel on satellite TV some year after its end and in the digital channel Mediaset Extra from 2011.

Foreign version
The format of Non è la RAI was purchased by the Brazilian television network SBT, which produced a local version called Fantasia, aired between 1997 and 2000 and again between 2007 and 2008.

Notes

External links
 
 

Italian comedy television series
Mediaset
1991 Italian television series debuts
1995 Italian television series endings
1990s Italian television series
Canale 5 original programming